Felipe Patavino Saad (born 11 September 1983), known as Felipe Saad, is a Brazilian former professional footballer who played as a defender.

Whilst at Guingamp, then in Ligue 2, Saad played in the 2009 Coupe de France Final in which they beat Rennes.

Career
In July 2015, Saad joined Strasbourg from Caen, signing a two-year contract.

In July 2019, Saad joined Ligue 2 side Paris FC from league rivals FC Lorient. He had been facing new competition at Lorient with the arrivals of defenders Julien Laporte and Thomas Fontaine for the 2019–20 season.

In summer 2020, after being released by Paris FC, Saad retired from playing and took up a position at former club Caen as "recruiter" while also working as a consultant for RMC. Beside that, he was also hired as a scout for his former club, Caen. A year later, he was hired by as a translator. In March 2022, he got a new role at Marseille, as technical coordinator.

Personal life
Saad is of Italian descent, and of Lebanese descent through his great-grandfather.

Honours
Guingamp
 Coupe de France: 2008–09

References

External links
 
 

1983 births
Living people
Sportspeople from Santos, São Paulo
Association football defenders
Brazilian footballers
Brazilian people of Italian descent
Brazilian people of Lebanese descent
Brazilian expatriate footballers
Expatriate footballers in France
Esporte Clube Vitória players
Paysandu Sport Club players
Botafogo de Futebol e Regatas players
Ligue 1 players
Ligue 2 players
Championnat National players
En Avant Guingamp players
Thonon Evian Grand Genève F.C. players
AC Ajaccio players
Stade Malherbe Caen players
RC Strasbourg Alsace players
FC Lorient players
Paris FC players
Sportspeople of Lebanese descent